The 1956 Nippon Professional Baseball season was the seventh season of operation of Nippon Professional Baseball (NPB).

Regular season

Standings

Postseason

Japan Series

League leaders

Central League

Pacific League

Awards
Most Valuable Player
Takehiko Bessho, Yomiuri Giants (CL)
Futoshi Nakanishi, Nishitetsu Lions (PL)
Rookie of the Year
Noboru Akiyama, Taiyo Whales (CL)
Kazuhisa Inao, Nishitetsu Lions (PL)
Eiji Sawamura Award
Masaichi Kaneda, Kokutetsu Swallows (CL)

See also
1956 Major League Baseball season

References